Myrcia neocambessedeana (synonym Gomidesia cambessedesiana) was a species of plant in the family Myrtaceae. It was endemic to Brazil.

References

Extinct plants
neocambessedeana
Taxonomy articles created by Polbot
Taxobox binomials not recognized by IUCN